Passeron is a French surname.

Notable people with this surname include:
 Aurélien Passeron (born 1984), French cyclist
 Jean-Claude Passeron (born 1930), French sociologist

References